Last Run is a 2001 British-German action film, directed by Anthony Hickox, starring Armand Assante and Jürgen Prochnow.

Cast
Armand Assante as Frank Banner
Jürgen Prochnow as Andrus Bukarin
Ornella Muti as Danny
Corey Johnson as Jon Neely 
Barna Illyés as Georgi Kaminski
Anthony Hickox as Riley Chapin 
Annabel Brooks as Tina 
Viki Kiss as Kerlov 
Edit Illés as Kerlov 
Sándor Téri as Yuri
Martin McDougall as Junior 
Niki Barabás as Number Two 
Norman Austin as Number One 
David Foxxe as Leo Schiff 
Ralph Brown as Simn

Notes

2001 action thriller films
2000s spy films
British action thriller films
British spy films
German action thriller films
Films directed by Anthony Hickox
Films set in Hungary
English-language German films
2000s English-language films
German spy films
2000s British films
2000s German films